The 2000 ASB Classic was a women's tennis tournament played on outdoor hard courts at the ASB Tennis Centre in Auckland, New Zealand that was part of Tier IV of the 2000 WTA Tour. It was the 15th edition of the tournament and was held from 3 January until 8 January 2000. Second-seeded Anne Kremer won the singles title and earned $16,000 first-prize money.

Finals

Singles
 Anne Kremer defeated  Cara Black, 6–4, 6–4
 It was Kremer' 1st title of her career.

Doubles
 Cara Black /  Alexandra Fusai defeated  Barbara Schwartz /  Patricia Wartusch, 3–6, 6–3, 6–4

Prize money 

Total prize money for the tournament was $110,000.

See also
 2000 Heineken Open – men's tournament

References

External links
 Tournament edition details
 Tournament draws

ASB Classic
WTA Auckland Open
ASB
ASB
2000 in New Zealand tennis